The 2015 Drive DMACK Fiesta Trophy was the second season of the Drive DMACK Fiesta Trophy, an auto racing championship recognized by the Fédération Internationale de l'Automobile, running in support of the World Rally Championship. It uses Ford Fiesta R2Ts.

The second title was won by Norway's Marius Aasen and Veronica Engan, his lady co-driver. Runner up for the second year in a row was Wales's Tom Cave, third was Finn Max Vatanen.

Drivers

The following drivers took part in the championship.

FIA Drive DMACK Cup for Drivers

External links
Official website of the World Rally Championship
Official website of the Fédération Internationale de l'Automobile

2015
2015 in rallying